Mitchell A. Ucovich (September 27, 1915 – December 1, 1989) was an American football offensive lineman in the National Football League (NFL) for the Washington Redskins, Chicago Cardinals, and the Baltimore Colts.  Ucovich played college football at San Jose State University.

External links
 

1915 births
1989 deaths
Players of American football from San Jose, California
American football offensive tackles
American football offensive guards
San Jose State Spartans football players
Washington Redskins players
Chicago Cardinals players
Baltimore Colts (1947–1950) players